This chronology of the Turkish War of Independence (also known as Turkish war of liberation) is a timeline of events during the Turkish War of Independence (1919–1923). The timeline also includes the background events starting with the end of the First World War. The events are classified according to the campaigns and parties involved. Pictures are included for the significant events.

Legend

1918

1919

1920

1921

1922

1923

2000s

Sources and references

 A chronology of Atatürk's life and the Turkish War of Independence by the Turkish Ministry of Culture 
 Turkish Ministry of Interior Affairs monthly based calendar of capture and re-capture of cities during the war 
 Compendium of documents and bibliography relating to Provisional National Government of the Southwestern Caucasus by the Turkish Grand National Assembly 
 Report of the Inter-Allied Commission of Inquiry (May-September 1919) by the Members of the Commission; Adm. Bristol, the US Delegate - Gen. Hare, the British Delegate - Gen. Bunoust, the French Delegate - Gen. Dall'Olio, the Italian Delegate. The statements in defense of the Greek government presented by Col. Mazarakis.

Footnotes

See also
 Timeline of Mustafa Kemal Atatürk
 Outline and timeline of the Greek genocide

Timeline
Turkish War of Independence